Lionel Cazaux (1906-1970) was a French composer of film scores. In the early 1930s he worked at Paramount Pictures's Joinville Studios in Paris.

Selected filmography
 The Pure Truth (1931)
 The Man in Evening Clothes (1931)
 Delphine (1931)
 Holiday (1931)
 Alone (1931)
 Suzanne (1932)
 Miche (1932)
 A Star Disappears (1932)
 The Accomplice (1932)
 Happy Days (1941)

References

Bibliography
 Claire Blakeway. Jacques Prévert: Popular French Theatre and Cinema. Fairleigh Dickinson Univ Press, 1990.

External links

1906 births
1970 deaths
French composers
Musicians from Le Havre